Kostino is a rural locality (a village) in Pevomaysky Selsoviet, Yanaulsky District, Bashkortostan, Russia. The population was 158 as of 2010. There are 4 streets.

Geography 
Kostino is located 11 km southwest of Yanaul (the district's administrative centre) by road. Susady-Ebalak is the nearest rural locality.

References 

Rural localities in Yanaulsky District